Jeroen Phaff, b. 1965 in Wormerveer (the Netherlands), is a Dutch musical artist.

Musicals:
 L'Histoire du Soldat: playing Ramus and Igor Stravinsky
 de Nachtegaal: playing Theo Loevendie
 The Phantom of the Opera: playing Raoul
 Evita: playing Juan Perón
 Les Misérables: playing Bishop Lesgles and ansamble
 Dance of the Vampires: playing count Krolock in Vienna
 Elisabeth: playing Emperor Franz Josef
 De Griezelbus: playing Lucifer
 Aida: playing Zoser
 The Flying Dutchman: playing Willem van der Decken
 The Lion King: playing Scar and Pumba
 Jesus Christ Superstar: playing Pontius Pilate
 The Wiz: playing the lion
 Chess: playing Anatoly Sergievsky
 Tarzan: Korchak

In 2002 Jeroen won the John Kraaijkamp musical award for best male part.  He came third in the 1995 Dutch talent show A Star Is Born.

References

1965 births
Living people
Dutch male musical theatre actors
People from Zaanstad